J. Emile Verret (September 13, 1885 – February 9, 1965) was a Louisiana politician who served as lieutenant governor Louisiana from 1944 to 1948.

Born in Iberia Parish, Louisiana, Verret received an undergraduate degree from University of Louisiana at Lafayette (then the Southwestern Louisiana Industrial Institute) in 1905, and attended Soule Business College in New Orleans.

In 1947, during his service as Lieutenant Governor, when Governor Jimmie Davis was out of state and a hurricane forced the evacuation of the capital, Verret signed a proclamation declaring his house in New Iberia to be the acting state capitol for the day. The Daily Iberian republished this article fifty years later.

Notes

References
 "J. Emile Verret", A Dictionary of Louisiana Biography, Vol. 2 (1988), p. 810
 William J. "Bill" Dodd, Peapatch Politics: The Earl Long Era in Louisiana Politics, Baton Rouge: Claitor's, 1991
 Lafayette Daily Advertiser, February 10, 1965

Lieutenant Governors of Louisiana
Louisiana Democrats
1885 births
1965 deaths
Cajun people
University of Louisiana at Lafayette alumni
People from New Iberia, Louisiana
School board members in Louisiana
American people of French descent
20th-century American businesspeople
20th-century American politicians